Jeremy Beau Sides, aka "Nug" from the YouTube channel Exploring with Nug,  is an American scuba diver and civilian crime investigator who investigates missing person cases and missing items. In 2021, he found the bodies of Erin Foster and Jeremy Bechtel, who had been missing for 21 years.

Personal life 
Sides is from Acworth, Georgia. He is married and a father of two children.

Before diving full-time, Sides was a metal detectorist as a hobby,  searching for American Civil War relics and other lost items around his hometown.

Career 
After high school, Sides worked for the United States Navy, in aviation hydraulics. Later he worked in the automotive industry.

Diving 
When Sides  started a metal detectorist YouTube channel in 2016, friends at work gave him the nickname Nug, joking that he was looking for gold. It stuck, and he changed the name of his channel to Exploring with Nug as he started exploring more and doing less metal detecting.

Sides chooses unsolved missing person cases via the Charley Project online missing persons database, focusing on cases where drivers went missing near bodies of water.

Missing person cases 
In October 2021, Sides assisted Adventures with Purpose team while they found the truck owned by Thomas Thornton, a missing Vietnam War veteran from Tyler County, Texas. A body was found inside the truck, which police said was likely Thornton's.

In November 2021, Sides found a car containing the body of Miriam Ruth Hemphill, who had been missing since July 2005. 

In December 2021, he found the car containing the bodies of two teenagers in the case of the disappearance of Erin Foster and Jeremy Bechtel.

In January 2022, he and two other divers found the vehicle of murder victim Alan Livingston, who had been missing since 1983. The FBI removed the body with local police in October 2022.

References

External links 

 Exploring with Nug official YouTube account

Year of birth missing (living people)
Living people
People from Cobb County, Georgia
American YouTubers
American underwater divers